These are the list of results that England have played from 1990 to 1999.

1990 
Scores and results list England's points tally first.

1991 
Scores and results list England's points tally first.

1992 
Scores and results list England's points tally first.

1993 
Scores and results list England's points tally first.

1994 
Scores and results list England's points tally first.

1995 
Scores and results list England's points tally first.

1996 
Scores and results list England's points tally first.

1997 
Scores and results list England's points tally first.

1998 
Scores and results list England's points tally first.

1999 
Scores and results list England's points tally first.

Year Box 

1990–99
1989–90 in English rugby union
1990–91 in English rugby union
1991–92 in English rugby union
1992–93 in English rugby union
1993–94 in English rugby union
1994–95 in English rugby union
1995–96 in English rugby union
1996–97 in English rugby union
1997–98 in English rugby union
1998–99 in English rugby union